And Finally may refer to
 ...And Finally, a 2000 album by Northern Irish rock band Scheer
 And Finally, a 2022 memoir by Henry Marsh
 And Finally with Trevor McDonald, a 2021 documentary series hosted by Trevor McDonald